A cardigan is a type of knitted sweater that has an open front, and is worn like a jacket.

Description

Commonly cardigans are open fronted and have buttons: garments that are tied are instead considered a robe.
Knit garments with zippers can also be referred to as a cardigan. A current fashion trend has the garment with no buttons or zipper and hangs open by design. By contrast, a pullover (or sweater) does not open in front but must be "pulled over" the head to be worn. It may be machine- or hand-knitted. Traditionally, cardigans were made of wool but can now be made of cotton, synthetic fibers, or any combination thereof.

History
The cardigan was named after James Brudenell, 7th Earl of Cardigan, a British Army major general who led the Charge of the Light Brigade at the Battle of Balaclava during the Crimean War. It is modelled after the knitted wool waistcoat that British officers supposedly wore during the war. The legend of the event and the fame that Lord Cardigan achieved after the war led to the rise of the garment's popularity – supposedly, Brudenell invented the cardigan after noticing that the tails of his coat had accidentally been burnt off in a fireplace.

The term originally referred only to a knitted sleeveless vest, but expanded to other types of garment over time. Coco Chanel is credited with popularizing cardigans for women because "she hated how tight-necked men's sweaters messed up her hair when she pulled them over her head." The garment is mostly associated with the college culture of the Roaring Twenties and early 1930s, being also popular throughout the 1950s, 1970s, 1990s, 2000s and into the early 2010s.

Usage
Plain cardigans are often worn over shirts and inside suit jackets as a less formal version of the waistcoat or vest that restrains the necktie when the jacket has been removed. Its versatility means it can be worn in casual or formal settings and in any season, but it is most popular during cool weather.

Monochromatic cardigans, in sleeved or vest form, may be viewed as a conservative fashion staple. As an item of formal clothing for any gender, it is worn over a button-down dress shirt. A less formal style is wearing a T-shirt underneath.

In popular culture
 Singer Perry Como wore cardigans on the television program The Perry Como Show. The trademark sweaters complemented his easy-going style of singing.
 Fred Rogers, star of the long-running children's program Mister Rogers' Neighborhood, donned a cardigan at the beginning of each episode. The cardigans were made by his mother and closed with a zipper instead of buttons.
 Steve McQueen popularised cardigans, wearing it in the 1968 action thriller film Bullitt and in his personal life.
 Kurt Cobain of the band Nirvana wore vintage cardigans. The sweater he wore during MTV's Nirvana Unplugged concert sold at auction for $137,500 in November 2015. It was reported to have a burn hole, a button missing, and discoloration around the pockets.
 Singer-songwriter Taylor Swift wrote a song called "Cardigan" and used cardigans as part of her merchandise accompanying the song and her eighth studio album, Folklore (2020).
 The Cardigans are a Swedish rock band formed in 1992, best known for the singles "Lovefool" and "My Favourite Game".

See also
Sweater design
Twinset

References

External links

1920s fashion
1970s fashion
1980s fashion
1990s fashion
2000s fashion
2010s fashion
American fashion
Canadian fashion
History of clothing (Western fashion)
History of fashion
Knitted garments
Sweaters
Tops (clothing)
Wool clothing